Liborio Prosperi ('Lib')  Liberio Prosperi (Foligno, 1854 – Foligno, 1928), was an Italian-born artist who belonged to a group of international artists producing caricatures for the British Vanity Fair magazine. He contributed 55 caricatures  between 1885 and 1903, signed 'Lib', and concentrating mainly on the racing set.

His 1886 multi-portrait caricature The Lobby of the House of Commons is on view in the Victorian Gallery of the National Portrait Gallery in London.

The figures depicted by the artists of Vanity Fair included royalty, statesmen, scientists, authors, actors, soldiers, scholars and sporting men. The last issue of Vanity Fair appeared in 1914. In its forty-five year run, it provided readers a variety of memorable caricatures of Victorian and Edwardian personalities.

Image gallery

References

External links

 Art of the Print

1854 births
1920 deaths
Italian caricaturists
British caricaturists
19th-century Italian painters
Italian male painters
20th-century Italian painters
Vanity Fair (British magazine) artists
Vanity Fair (British magazine) caricatures
19th-century Italian male artists
20th-century Italian male artists